Rodrigo Andrés Ríos Rodríguez (born Santiago, Chile) is a Chilean former football midfielder now serving as assistant coach for Austin FC.

Club career
In 1987, Ríos joined the Universidad Católica youth system.  In February 1996, he entered his first game with the Catolica first team in the Primera División de Chile.  In 2001, he moved to Everton de Viña del Mar before moving to Palestino in 2002.  From 2003 to 2004, he played for Unión Española.  In 2005, he moved to the United States where he signed with the Atlanta Silverbacks in the USL First Division.  He was a 2005 and 2006 second team All Star.  The Silverbacks withdrew from the league following the 2008 season.

International
In 1996, Ríos earned eight caps with the Chilean U-20 national team.  In 2000, he played six games, scoring one goal, with the U-23 team during qualification for the 2000 Summer Olympics.  However, he was not selected for the final roster.

Coaching
The Silverbacks club re-emerged in the North American Soccer League for the 2011 season. In preparation, the Silverbacks hired Ríos as Director of Soccer on December 18, 2010. 

In 2012, Rios started coaching Youth Soccer at Norcross Soccer Academy, he was awarded Girls Academy "Coach of the year" for the state of Georgia in 2013. He currently is USSF 'A' License Coach. In June 2016, he joined Atlanta United as an Academy Coach.

Since 2021, he has performed as the assistant coach for Austin FC in the Major League Soccer.

References

External links
 Atlanta Silverbacks Player Profile
 Meet the Players
 Rodrigo Rios | Austin FC
 Rodrigo Ríos at CeroaCero 

1977 births
Living people
Footballers from Santiago
Chilean footballers
Chilean expatriate footballers
Chile under-20 international footballers
Club Deportivo Universidad Católica footballers
Everton de Viña del Mar footballers
Club Deportivo Palestino footballers
Unión Española footballers
Atlanta Silverbacks players
Tercera División de Chile players 
Chilean Primera División players
USL First Division players
Association football midfielders
Chilean football managers
Chilean expatriate football managers
Atlanta United FC non-playing staff
Austin FC non-playing staff
Chilean expatriate sportspeople in the United States
Expatriate soccer players in the United States
Expatriate soccer managers in the United States